Stillwater Central School District is a school located in the village of Stillwater, New York. The school has two buildings on its campus; one is for elementary grades and the other holds the middle and high school classes. The school serves Stillwater and portions of the towns of Saratoga and Easton.

Student life
The school mascot is the Warriors and the colors are maroon and white, although black has been used on some older uniforms. Recently, a new football/soccer field with lights replaced the old. The field has a turf surface and was built over the old baseball field. The new baseball field was moved to the American Legion in the middle of the village. Along with that, a new gymnasium has been built to better serve the school.

Sports that are offered by the school include football, boys and girls soccer, golf, girls volleyball, cross country, basketball and football cheerleading, alpine skiing, boys and girls basketball, indoor track, baseball, softball, outdoor track, bowling and a Rowing Club.

Students at Stillwater Central School District have access to several extracurriculars and clubs, including nationally recognized programs such as Link Crew and Key Club.

Notable alumni
Scott Sicko, former National Football League (NFL) player

External links 
 School website

Schools in Saratoga County, New York
Public high schools in New York (state)
Public middle schools in New York (state)
Public elementary schools in New York (state)